Anthranilic acid is an aromatic acid with the formula C6H4(NH2)(CO2H) and has a sweetish taste. The molecule consists of a benzene ring, ortho-substituted with a carboxylic acid and an amine. As a result of containing both acidic and basic functional groups, the compound is amphoteric. Anthranilic acid is a white solid when pure, although commercial samples may appear yellow. The anion [C6H4(NH2)(CO2)]−, obtained by the deprotonation of anthranilic acid, is called anthranilate. Anthranilic acid was once thought to be a vitamin and was referred to as vitamin L1 in that context, but it is now known to be non-essential in human nutrition.

Structure
Although not usually referred to as such, it is an amino acid. Solid anthranilic acid typically consists of both the amino-carboxylic acid and the zwitterionic ammonium carboxylate forms, and has a monoclinic crystal structure with space group P21. It is triboluminescent. Above , it converts to an orthorhombic form with space group Pbca, which is not triboluminescent; a non-triboluminescent monoclinic phase with similar structure is also known.

Production
Many routes to anthranilic acid have been described. Industrially it is produced from phthalic anhydride, beginning with amination:
C6H4(CO)2O + NH3 + NaOH → C6H4(C(O)NH2)CO2Na + H2O
The resulting sodium salt of phthalamic acid is decarbonylated via a Hofmann rearrangement of the amide group, induced by hypochlorite: 
C6H4(C(O)NH2)CO2Na + HOCl → C6H4NH2CO2H + NaCl + CO2
A related method involves treating phthalimide with sodium hypobromite in aqueous sodium hydroxide, followed by neutralization. In the era when indigo dye was obtained from plants, it was degraded to give anthranilic acid.

Anthranilic acid was first obtained by base-induced degradation of indigo.

Biosynthesis

Anthranilic acid is biosynthesized from chorismic acid by the action of anthranilate synthase. In organisms capable of tryptophan synthesis, anthranilate is a precursor to the amino acid tryptophan via the attachment of phosphoribosyl pyrophosphate to the amine group. After then, cyclization occurs to produce indole.

Uses
Industrially, anthranilic acid is an intermediate in the production of azo dyes and saccharin. It and its esters are used in preparing perfumes to mimic jasmine and orange, pharmaceuticals (loop diuretics, such as furosemide) and UV-absorber as well as corrosion inhibitors for metals and mold inhibitors in soy sauce.

Anthranilate-based insect repellents have been proposed as replacements for DEET.

Fenamic acid is a derivative of anthranilic acid, which in turn is a nitrogen isostere of salicylic acid, which is the active metabolite of aspirin. Several non-steroidal anti-inflammatory drugs, including mefenamic acid, tolfenamic acid, flufenamic acid, and meclofenamic acid are derived from fenamic acid or anthranilic acid and are called "anthranilic acid derivatives" or "fenamates".

Reactions
Anthranilic acid can be diazotized to give the diazonium cation [C6H4(CO2H)(N2)]+. This cation can be used to generate benzyne, dimerized to give diphenic acid, or undergo diazonium coupling reactions such as in the synthesis of methyl red.

It reacts with phosgene to give isatoic anhydride, a versatile reagent.

Chlorination of anthranilic acid gives the 2,4-dichloro derivative, which can undergo reductive coupling to form a biaryl compound.

Safety and regulation
It is also a DEA List I Chemical because of its use in making the now-widely outlawed euphoric sedative drug methaqualone (Quaalude, Mandrax).

See also
 Kynureninase
 3-Aminobenzoic acid
 4-Aminobenzoic acid
 Methyl anthranilate

References